Gaius Licinius Macer Calvus (28 May 82 BC – c. 47 BC) was an orator and poet of ancient Rome.

Son of Licinius Macer and thus a member of the gens Licinia, he was a friend of the poet Catullus, whose style and subject matter he shared. Calvus' oratorical style opposed the "Asian" school in favor of a simpler Attic model: he characterized Cicero as wordy and artificial. Twenty-one speeches are mentioned, including several against Publius Vatinius.

Calvus was apparently short, since Catullus alludes to him as salaputium disertum (eloquent Lilliputian). Seneca the Elder also mentions his short stature, and refers a story in which Calvus asked to be raised to a platform, so that he could defend one of his clients. 

F. Plessis published fragments of Calvus in 1896.

See also
 Licinia (gens)

References
 Weiss, M. "An Oscanism in Catullus 53", Classical Philology 91 (1996) 353–359.

References

External links
 Catullus poems mentioning Calvus

Ancient Roman poets
Ancient Roman rhetoricians
Atticists (rhetoricians)
Golden Age Latin writers
Macer Calvus, Gaius
1st-century BC Romans
1st-century BC Roman poets
82 BC births
40s BC deaths